Parliamentary elections were held in Kosovo on 17 November 2001. The first President of Kosovo taking office after the start of the UN Administration Ibrahim Rugova, was re elected and took office on 2 March 2002. The elections were held under the government of the United Nations Interim Administration Mission in Kosovo.

Results

References

Elections in Kosovo
Kosovo
2001 in Kosovo
Elections in Serbia and Montenegro
Elections in Serbia